José Artur Barbosa de Oliveira (born October 22, 1984) is a Brazilian football player, currently playing for Figueirense. He plays as a right back.

Career
Artur began his career as a centre back.

Honours
Palmeiras
Copa do Brasil: 2012

References

External links
Profile at Palmeiras website

1984 births
Living people
Brazilian footballers
Associação Desportiva São Caetano players
Sociedade Esportiva Palmeiras players
Associação Atlética Ponte Preta players
Figueirense FC players
Campeonato Brasileiro Série A players
Campeonato Brasileiro Série B players
Association football defenders